Konstan is a surname. Notable people with the surname include:

David Konstan (born 1940), American historian
Joseph A. Konstan, American computer scientist